The Superior Air Parts XP-360 is an aircraft engine, designed and produced by Superior Air Parts of Coppell, Texas, United States for use in homebuilt aircraft.

The company is owned by the Chinese company Superior Aviation Beijing, which is 60% owned by Chairman Cheng Shenzong and 40% owned by Beijing E-Town, an economic development agency of the municipal government of Beijing.

Design and development
The engine is a four-cylinder four-stroke, horizontally-opposed,  displacement, air-cooled, direct-drive, gasoline engine design. It produces  standard, although  and  versions are available. It is available in carburetor and fuel injected versions.

The engine is not type certified and is therefore intended for homebuilt aircraft.

Specifications (XP-360)

See also

References

External links

Superior Air Parts engines
Air-cooled aircraft piston engines
1990s aircraft piston engines